Mujibur Rahman Khan was journalist and Indian nationalist activist.

Early life and education
Mujibur Rahman Khan was born in Nehalpur, Bashirhat, 24 Parganas.

Career
He began his association with newspapers at first as a letter-writer to various newspapers and periodicals, particularly to The Bengalee of Surendranath Banerjee. and later became acontributor for The Sudhakar. He worked for some time as an editor of the weekly, Islam Rabi. In 1906, Rahman was appointed editor of the English weekly, The Mussalman, established by a barrister, Abdur Rasul.

In 1936, Mujibur Rahman Khan was forced to leave the Mussalman which was sympathetic to the Muslim League. In 1937, he established the periodical The Comrade with the help of fellow Indian nationalists.

Death
Mujibur Rahman Khan died in October 1940, following years of paralysis.

References 

Year of birth missing
1940 deaths
Bengali Muslims
20th-century Bengalis
19th-century Bengalis
19th-century Indian journalists
20th-century Indian journalists
Journalists in British India